The diocesan system of Catholic church government in Paraguay comprises only a Latin hierarchy, joint in the nation episcopal conference, no Eastern Catholic jurisdiction :
 one ecclesiastical province, headed by a Metropolitan archbishop. The provinces are in turn subdivided into eleven suffragan dioceses, each headed by a bishop. 
 two missionary, pre-diocesan (exempt) Apostolic Vicariates 
 the also exempt military Ordinariate.

All defunct jurisdictions are direct precursors of current ones.

There is also an Apostolic Nunciature to Paraguay as papal diplomatic representation  (embassy level).

Current Latin Dioceses

Ecclesiastical province of Asunción
 Metropolitan Archdiocese of Asunción
Diocese of Benjamín Aceval 
Diocese of Caacupé 
Diocese of Carapeguá 
Diocese of Ciudad del Este
Diocese of Concepción en Paraguay 
Diocese of Coronel Oviedo 
Diocese of Encarnación 
Diocese of San Juan Bautista de las Misiones
Diocese of San Lorenzo
Diocese of San Pedro
Diocese of Villarrica del Espíritu Santo

Latin Sui iuris Jurisdictions 
 Military Bishopric of Paraguay (for armed forces and paramilitary police)

Pre-diocesan 
 Apostolic Vicariate of Chaco Paraguayo
 Apostolic Vicariate of Pilcomayo

See also 
 List of Catholic dioceses (structured view)

Sources and external links 
 GCatholic.org.
 Catholic-Hierarchy entry.

Paraguay
Catholic dioceses